The Gershwin Connection is an album by American pianist Dave Grusin released in 1991, recorded for the GRP label. The album reached #1 on Billboard'''s jazz chart. The medley Bess, You Is My Woman Now/I Loves You Porgy received the 1992 Grammy Award for Best Arrangement of an Instrumental.

 Reception The Gershwin Connection'' received extremely positive reviews. Scott Yanow at All Music called the album "a very tasteful and respectful set -- a classy package". Leonard Feather in the Los Angeles Times gave it a four-star review and praised this "delightfully modest, jazz-oriented set, with Grusin's piano at its most graceful and tasteful".

Track listing
"That Certain Feeling" - 1:12
"Soon" - 4:03
"Fascinating Rhythm" - 5:01
"Prelude II" - 5:39
"How Long Has This Been Going On?" - 5:13
"There's a Boat Dat's Leavin' Soon for New York" - 5:40
"My Man's Gone Now" - 6:52
"Maybe" - 3:51
"Our Love is Here to Stay" - 3:14
"'S Wonderful" - 3:47
"I've Got Plenty O' Nuthin'" - 6:06
"Nice Work if You Can Get It" - 3:30
Medley: "Bess, You Is My Woman Now/I Loves You Porgy" - 5:48

Personnel
Dave Grusin - Keyboards, Arranger, Conductor
Chick Corea - Keyboards
Don Grusin - Keyboards
Lee Ritenour - Guitars
John Pattitucci - Bass
Gary Burton - Vibraphones
Dave Weckl - Drums
Sonny Emory - Drums
Eddie Daniels - Clarinet
Eric Marienthal - Saxophone
Sal Marquez - Trumpet

Charts

References

External links
Dave Grusin-The Gershwin Connection at Discogs

1991 albums
GRP Records albums
Dave Grusin albums
Recordings of music by George Gershwin